Asemolea minuta is a species of beetle in the family Cerambycidae. It was described by Bates in 1872. It is known from Honduras, Guatemala, Nicaragua and Costa Rica.

References

Calliini
Beetles described in 1872